Sidewheel, or Sidewheeler  or Sidewheels may refer to:
 Sidewheel steamer, type of paddle steamer
 Paddle wheel, type of water wheel
 Training wheels